Truebella skoptes is a species of toad in the family Bufonidae.
It is endemic to Peru.
Its natural habitat is subtropical or tropical high-altitude grassland.

References

Truebella
Amphibians of Peru
Amphibians of the Andes
Taxonomy articles created by Polbot
Amphibians described in 1995